Mitchell 'Mitch' Smith (born 4 September 1966 in Arizona, U.S.) is former professional basketball player. He played most of his career in Turkey. He graduated from the University of Utah with a B.Sc. degree in sociology in 1989.

References

External links
Official LinkedIn Page
Turkish League Profile

1966 births
Living people
American expatriate basketball people in Belgium
American expatriate basketball people in Spain
American expatriate basketball people in Turkey
American Latter Day Saints
Basketball players from Phoenix, Arizona
American men's basketball players
Centers (basketball)
Converts to Mormonism
Fenerbahçe men's basketball players
Karşıyaka basketball players
High school basketball coaches in the United States
Power forwards (basketball)
Utah Utes men's basketball players